Maurizio Lazzarato (born 1955) is an Italian sociologist and philosopher, residing in Paris, France. In the 1970s, he was an activist in the workers' movement (Autonomia Operaia) in Italy. Lazzarato was a founding member of the editorial board of the journal Multitudes. He is a researcher at Matisse/CNRS, Pantheon-Sorbonne University (University Paris I), and a member of the International College of Philosophy in Paris.

Biography
Lazzarato studied at the University of Padua in the 1970s, where he was active in the Autonomia Operaia movement. He left Italy in the late 1970s for exile in France to escape political prosecution, although the charges against him were abandoned in the 1990s.

Thought

Lazzarato is known for his essay "Immaterial Labor" that appeared in a collection of contemporary Italian political theory edited by Marxist philosophers Michael Hardt and Paolo Virno, called Radical Thought in Italy (1996). His research focuses on immaterial labor, the transformation of wage labor, and work, and cognitive capitalism. He is also interested in the concepts of biopolitics and bioeconomics.

Works on debt

Lazzarato has written two closely related works on the subject of debt, The Making of the Indebted Man and Governing by Debt.  Both books were translated into English and published as part of the Semiotext(e) Intervention Series.  In both works, Lazzarato uses continental philosophy and economic data to critique debt and neoliberalism from a left-wing perspective.

The Making of the Indebted Man

In The Making of the Indebted Man, Lazzarato examines debt as it is experienced by individuals, specifically the subject; he also presents a case that the debtor-creditor relationship is a central category of economics—more important than money or finance, for example.  In the modern economy, it is taken for granted that debts must be repaid, and much of economic activity is driven by lending with the expectation (or: promise) of future repayment.  Lazzarato observes that in order for such an economy to function, its actors must first be socialized to accept the premise that debts must be repaid.  This entails that they become capable of making promises (to repay a debt) and of feeling guilt (on failing to repay a debt).  To illustrate this process, he refers to the second treatise of Nietzsche's Genealogy of Morality, which deals with the concepts of guilt, debt, and socialization.

Lazzarato refers to the socializing process of creating individual subjects as "subjectivation".  He also contrasts the Nietzschean view of credit/debt with those given by Marx and by Deleuze and Guattari in Anti-Oedipus.  The latter part of the book is a criticism of debt as used in European neoliberal governance, introducing ideas which are developed more fully in Governing by Debt.

The Making of the Indebted Man has proved crucial for the application of the theorizing of neoliberal debt in relation to material culture and contemporary art.

Governing by Debt

In Governing by Debt, Lazzarato uses the vocabulary developed in Making of the Indebted Man to examine how debt is employed by states and private enterprise, as opposed to individuals. The book is a critique of neoliberalism and governmentality where the latter refers to a form of government which responds to economic demands, a notion closely related to ordoliberalism.  Lazzarato characterizes American student debt as an ideal example of the credit/debt economy, and also uses history and anthropology to trace a cultural notion of "infinite debt" (e.g. life-debt, original sin) which he argues has informed the modern economy.

The book's central idea is that basic categories of the economic and political spheres (which are commonly opposed, or spoken of as separate items) are in fact not distinct, but closely related and overlapping. For example, governments and businesses closely coordinate their policies, laws, business practices and expectations, and are therefore coupled with each other. Lazzarato cites the work of Carl Schmitt to illustrate the point. Lazzarato also cites Foucault's work The Birth of Biopolitics to illustrate the social experience of debt; however he criticizes the distinction that Foucault makes between states and economies, with classical liberalism as a mediator. Further, the distinction between industrial capitalism and financial capitalism is questioned; however Lazzarato retains the distinction in the sense that financial capitalism is the "purest" form of capitalism, because it simply transforms one form of money into another form of money through valorization (e.g. via the circulation and trade of financial products), without using a commodity as an intermediate step. In Marxist terminology, this is expressed as M-M' (money creating different money), as opposed to M-C-M' (money creating a commodity, which yields different money). Lazzarato also cites Lenin's work Imperialism, the Highest Stage of Capitalism to indicate the primacy of financial capitalism, emergent during Lenin's period.

Lazzarato concludes the text by proposing refusal of work as a technique for the disruption of the modern economy.  He advocates for this goal because he attributes responsibility for human suffering during financial crises to capitalists and state actors, and not to any national population.  However (in Lazzarato's account) national populations are nevertheless made to pay for such crises and socialized to feel responsibility for them, through taxation, austerity, and media messaging:

Works
 "Immaterial Labor." In: Virno, Paolo, and Michael Hardt. 2010. Radical thought in Italy: A Potential Politics. Minneapolis, Minn. [u.a.]: Univ. of Minnesota Press.
 Marcel Duchamp et le refus du travail ; (suivi de :) Misère de la sociologie. 2014 Paris: Les Prairies ordinaires.
 The Making of the Indebted Man. 2012. South Pasadena, CA: Semiotext(e).
 Signs and Machines: Capitalism and the Production of Subjectivity. 2014. Los Angeles: Semiotext(e).
 Governing by Debt. 2015. South Pasadena, CA: Semiotext(e).
 "Neoliberalism, the Financial Crisis and the End of the Liberal State." Theory, Culture & Society. December 1, 2015. 32, 67-83.
 Alliez, Eric, and Maurizio Lazzarato. 2016. Guerres et capital. Paris: Editions Amsterdam.

Notes

References

1955 births
Autonomism
Living people
Italian Marxists
Italian sociologists
Libertarian socialists
Critics of work and the work ethic